Linda Tracey Ross (born February 27, 1959) is an American television actress, known for her role as Eve Russell on the NBC daytime soap opera, Passions (1999–2008).

Life and career
Ross was born in Brooklyn, New York, and attended Dwight Morrow High School in Englewood, New Jersey and then Douglass College. In 1984, she became the first winner in the Spokesmodel category on the television series Star Search. She later joined the cast of ABC daytime soap opera Ryan's Hope as Diana Douglas, appearing in show from 1985 to 1987. She later had a number of guest starring roles on prime time shows, such as The Cosby Show, Roc, Baywatch Nights, and Providence.

From 1999 to 2008, Ross starred as Eve Russell on the NBC daytime soap opera, Passions. Ross was nominated for the NAACP Image Award for Outstanding Actress in a Daytime Drama Series for nine consecutive years, for her performance as Eve Russell. Ross won the award on March 2, 2007.

Her son is rapper and singer Bryce Vine.

Filmography

References

External links
 

American soap opera actresses
African-American actresses
1959 births
Living people
Actresses from New Jersey
Douglass College alumni
Dwight Morrow High School alumni
People from Brooklyn
21st-century African-American people
21st-century African-American women
20th-century African-American people
20th-century African-American women